Reydell or Reydel is an unincorporated community in Jefferson County, Arkansas, United States. Reydell has a post office with ZIP code 72133.

Reydell is in the DeWitt School District. The community was already in the DeWitt district by the early 1950s. This district operates DeWitt High School.

References

Unincorporated communities in Jefferson County, Arkansas
Unincorporated communities in Arkansas